Canada has submitted films for the Academy Award for Best International Feature Film since 1971. The award is handed out annually by the United States Academy of Motion Picture Arts and Sciences to a feature-length motion picture produced outside the United States that contains primarily non-English dialogue. It was not created until the 1956 Academy Awards, in which a competitive Academy Award of Merit, known as the Best Foreign Language Film Award, was created for non-English speaking films, and has been given annually since.

, seven Canadian films have been nominated, including one winner, for the Academy Award for Best Foreign Language Film. Of these films, three have been directed by Denys Arcand: Jesus of Montreal, nominated at the 62nd Academy Awards; The Decline of the American Empire, nominated at the 59th Academy Awards; and its sequel, The Barbarian Invasions, which was the winner at the 76th Academy Awards. Arcand's Days of Darkness was shortlisted for the Oscar, but was not nominated. The other four Canadian directors to have their films nominated are Deepa Mehta for Water at the 79th Academy Awards, Denis Villeneuve for Incendies at the 83rd Academy Awards, Philippe Falardeau for Monsieur Lazhar at the 84th Academy Awards, and Kim Nguyen for War Witch at the 85th Academy Awards.

Of the 47 films selected to date as Canada's submission to the Academy Awards, 18 of them have also won the Canadian Screen Award for Best Motion Picture.

Submissions
The Academy of Motion Picture Arts and Sciences has invited the film industries of various countries to submit their best film for the Academy Award for Best Foreign Language Film since 1956. The Foreign Language Film Award Committee oversees the process and reviews all the submitted films. Following this, they vote via secret ballot to determine the five nominees for the award. Below is a list of the films that have been submitted by Canada for review by the academy for the award by year and the respective Academy Awards ceremony. With two exceptions (2001's Inuktitut Atanarjuat and 2005's Hindi Water), all submissions were Québécois films. All of these were in French, except for A Bullet in the Head which was spoken entirely in an invented language. Other French-language submissions have featured a substantial amount of Inuktitut (The Necessities of Life), Lingala (War Witch), Yiddish (Felix and Meira), and Mohawk and Algonquin (Hochelaga, Land of Souls).

For the 93rd Academy Awards, Canada's original submission was Deepa Mehta's Funny Boy, but the film was disqualified in December 2020 for containing too much dialogue in English.

See also
 List of Academy Award winners and nominees for Best Foreign Language Film
 List of Academy Award-winning foreign language films
 Top 10 Canadian Films of All Time
 Cinema of Canada
 Cinema of Quebec

Notes

References

External links
 The Official Academy Awards Database
 The Motion Picture Credits Database
 IMDb Academy Awards Page

Canada
Lists of Canadian films